The A2 road is a long road in Kenya extending from the Tanzanian border to the Ethiopian border.

The northern section of the road, from Isiolo to Moyale, was completely paved in 2016.

Towns  

The following towns, listed from north to south, are located along the highway.

 Moyale
 Marsabit
 Isiolo
 Nanyuki
 Thika
 Nairobi
 Athi River
 Kajiado
 Namanga

References 

Roads in Kenya